The 1951 season was the Hawthorn Football Club's 27th season in the Victorian Football League and 50th overall.

Fixture

Lightning Premiership

The lightning premiership was played between rounds 3 and 4.

Premiership Season

Ladder

References

Hawthorn Football Club seasons